Iğdır Futbol Kulübü, known as Alagöz Holding Iğdır Futbol Kulübü due to sponsorship reasons, is a Turkish professional football club based in Iğdır. They play in the TFF Third League. The club plays in green and white kits.

History 
The club was founded in 2016 as 76 Iğdır Belediyespor. After defeating Iğdır Esspor, they were entitled to represent the Iğdır Province for the first time in season 2020-2021 in the Turkish Regional Amateur League. The team managed to reach the play-offs finale, where it defeated Diyarbakırspor and got promoted to the TFF Third League, the fourth level in the Turkish football league system.

In September 2021 the name was officially changed to Iğdır Futbol Kulübü, while using the sponsor name Alagöz Holding Iğdır FK. They made national headlines after contracting famous footballer Batuhan Karadeniz.
Iğdır FK 2021–22 finished the season 3rd in TFF Third League 2nd group, beat 68 Aksaray Belediyespor in the play-off semi-finals and reached the final, lost as a result of penalties in the match against İskenderunspor in the final match, and lost the TFF Second League ticket.

League participations 
 TFF Third League
 2021–
 Turkish Regional Amateur League
 2020–2021
 Super Amateur Leagues
 2016–2020

See also 
 Iğdırspor

References

External links

2016 establishments in Turkey
Association football clubs established in 2016
Football clubs in Turkey
Sport in Iğdır
TFF Third League clubs